The Long Day of Inspector Blomfield is a 1968 German crime film directed by Rudolf Zehetgruber and starring Götz George, Werner Pochath and Anthony Steel.  It was one of a number of movies Steel made in Europe while based in Rome.

Premise
A drug addicted man takes over a British police station, holding it hostage with a bottle of nitroglycerine. He demands to see Inspector Blomfeld, but the Inspector is away dealing with another case.

Cast

References

External links

1968 films
1960s crime thriller films
German crime thriller films
West German films
1960s German-language films
Films directed by Rudolf Zehetgruber
Films set in London
1960s German films